Chengde, formerly known as Jehol and Rehe, is a prefecture-level city in Hebei province, situated about 225 km northeast of Beijing. It is best known as the site of the Mountain Resort, a vast imperial garden and palace formerly used by the Qing emperors as summer residence.  The permanent resident population is approximately 3,473,200 in 2017.

History

In 1703, Chengde was chosen by the Kangxi Emperor as the location for his summer residence. Constructed throughout the eighteenth century, the Mountain Resort was used by both the Yongzheng and Qianlong emperors. The site is currently an UNESCO World Heritage Site. Since the seat of government followed the emperor, Chengde was a political center of the Chinese empire during these times.

The city of Jeholan early romanization of Rehe via the French transcription of the northern suffix ér as eulreached its height under the Qianlong Emperor 1735-1796 (died 1799). The great Putuo Zongcheng Temple, loosely based on the Potala in Lhasa, was completed after just four years of work in 1771. It was heavily decorated with gold and the emperor worshipped in the Golden Pavilion. In the temple itself was a bronze-gilt statue of Tsongkhapa, the Reformer of the Gelugpa sect.

Under the Republic of China, Chengde was the capital of Rehe province. From 1933 to 1945 the city was under Japanese control as a part of the Manchurian puppet state known as Manchukuo. After World War II the Kuomintang government regained jurisdiction. In 1948, the People's Liberation Army took control of Chengde. It would remain a part of Rehe until 1955, when the province was abolished, and the city was incorporated into Hebei.

The city is home to large populations of ethnic minorities, Mongol and Manchu in particular.

Geography

Chengde is located in the northeastern portion of Hebei, with latitude 40° 12'－42° 37' N, and longitude 115° 54'－119° 15' E, and contains the northernmost point in the province. It borders Inner Mongolia, Liaoning, Beijing, and Tianjin. Neighbouring prefecture-level provincial cities are Qinhuangdao and Tangshan on the Bohai Gulf, and land-locked Zhangjiakou. Due to its Liaoning border, it is often considered a part of both the North and Northeast China regions. It is by area the largest prefecture in the province, though as most of its terrain is mountainous, its population density is low.

The Jehol or Rehe ("Hot River"), which gave Chengde its former name, was so named because it did not freeze in winter. Most sections of the river's former course are now dry because of modern dams.

Climate
Chengde has a four-season, monsoon-influenced humid continental climate (Köppen Dwa), with widely varying conditions through the prefecture due to its size: winters are moderately long, cold and windy, but dry, and summers are hot and humid. Spring warming is rapid, but dust storms can blow in from the Mongolian steppe; autumn cooling is similarly quick. With monthly percent possible sunshine ranging from 50% in July to 69% in October, the city receives 2,746 hours of sunshine annually.

Administrative divisions

Chengde comprises:

Sport
The first ever bandy match in China was organised in Chengde in January 2015 and was played between the Russian and Swedish top clubs Baykal-Energiya and Sandviken. Chengde city was one of the initiators when the China Bandy Federation was founded in December 2014. The city hosted the 2018 Women's Bandy World Championship. While the record number of participants in previous Women's Bandy World Championships was 7, the organisers had thought out measures with the goal to attract 12 participating countries. However, in the end 8 teams participated.

Religion
Chengde is the seat of the Catholic Diocese of Chengde.

Transport
With road and railroad links to Beijing, Chengde has developed into a distribution hub, and its economy is growing rapidly. The newly built Jingcheng Expressway connects Chengde directly to central Beijing, and more freeways are planned for the city. The city's new airport was opened on 31 May 2017.

Sights

The project of building Chengde Mountain Resort started in 1703 and finished in 1790. The whole mountain resort covers an area 5,640,000 square meters. It is the largest royal garden in China. The wall of the mountain resort is over 10,000 meters in length. In summers, emperors of the Qing dynasty came to the mountain resort to relax themselves and escape from the high temperature in Beijing.

The whole Resort can be divided into three areas which are lakes area, plains area and hills area. The lakes area, which includes 8 lakes, covers an area of 496,000 square meters. The plains area covers an area of 607,000 square meters. The emperors held horse races and hunted in the area. The largest area of the three is the hills area. It covers an area of 4,435,000 square meters. Hundreds of palaces and temples were built on the hills in this area.

The elaborate Mountain Resort features large parks with lakes, pagodas, and palaces ringed by a wall. Outside the wall are the Eight Outer Temples, built in varying architectural styles drawn from throughout China. One of the best-known of these is the Putuo Zongcheng Temple, built to resemble the Potala Palace in Lhasa, Tibet. The resort and outlying temples were made a UNESCO World Heritage Site in 1994. The nearby Puning Temple, built in 1755, houses the world's tallest wooden statue of the Bodhisattva Avalokiteśvara.

Another popular attraction of the Chengde area is Sledgehammer Peak, a large rock formation in the shape of an inverted sledgehammer. A variety of other mountains, valleys, and grasslands lie within the borders of the city.

Gallery

Sister cities
Chengde has city partnerships with the following locations:
 Santo André, São Paulo, Brazil
 Takasaki, Gunma, Japan
 Dakota County, Minnesota, United States
 Kashiwa, Chiba, Japan

References

Citations

Bibliography
 .
 .

External links

Chengde Government Online

 
Cities in Hebei
Prefecture-level divisions of Hebei
Populated places established in the 18th century